Amal Taha was an Iraqi film actress and comedienne. She died on 19 May 2016.

References

1956 births
2016 deaths
Iraqi film actresses
People from Wasit Governorate
Iraqi television actresses
Iraqi stage actresses